John Sylvester may refer to:

John Sylvester (admiral) (1904–1990), United States Navy admiral
John Sylvester (cricketer) (born 1969), Grenadian cricketer
John N. Sylvester (1909–1993), American politician in the state of Washington
John B. Sylvester, United States Army general
Johnny Sylvester (1915–1990), American businessman associated with Babe Ruth
John Sylvester, one of the pen names of British author Hector Hawton (1901–1975)

See also
John Silvester (disambiguation)